JAA is an abbreviation that can refer to

 Japan Aikido Association
 Japanese Archaeological Association
 Japan Asia Airways
 Jet Asia Airways
 Joint Aviation Authorities of Europe
 Jacksonville Aviation Authority

See also
 Jaa (disambiguation)